Crime Does Not Pay was an MGM anthology crime film series of shorts that ran from 1935-1947. Each episode was around 20 minutes in length and composer-conductor John Gart provided the music. It later spawned a radio series of the same name.

The radio show was recorded and broadcast at MGM's New York station, WMGM. Written by Ira Marion and directed by Marx B. Loeb, it aired for two years (October 10, 1949-October 10, 1951), including repeats. It moved to the Mutual Broadcasting System for its final run (January 7-December 22, 1952). For the most part, B movie actors were featured but occasionally one of MGM's major stars would make an appearance. These included Bela Lugosi, Everett Sloane, Ed Begley, John Loder and Lionel Stander. After the play, the actors usually returned to speak with the audience as themselves.

Film series episodes
 Buried Loot, with Robert Taylor
 Alibi Racket
 Desert Death
 A Thrill for Thelma
 Hit-and-Run Driver
 The Perfect Set-Up, with William Henry, Helene Chadwick, Frank Shannon, and Robert Dudley
 Foolproof
 The Public Pays (Oscar winner)
 Torture Money, with Edwin Maxwell and George Lynn (Oscar winner)
 It May Happen to You, with J. Carrol Naish
 Soak the Poor
 Give Till it Hurts, with Janet Beecher, Clay Clement, and Howard Hickman
 Behind the Criminal, with Edward Emerson, Walter Kingsford, Anna Q. Nilsson, and Joe Sawyer
 What Price Safety!, with Lionel Royce, George Huston, and John Wray
 Miracle Money, with John Miljan, Boyd Crawford, Robert Middlemass, and Fred Warren
 Come Across, with Bernard Nedell, Bernadene Hayes, Rita La Roy, and Donald Douglas
 A Criminal Is Born
 They're Always Caught, with Stanley Ridges, John Eldredge, Louis Jean Heydt, and Charles Waldron (Oscar nominee)
 Think it Over, with Lester Matthews, Charles D. Brown, Donald Barry and Dwight Frye
 The Wrong Way Out, with Kenneth Howell and Linda Terry
 Money to Loan, with Alan Dinehart, Paul Guilfoyle, John Butler, Addison Richards, and Tom Collins
 While America Sleeps, with Richard Purcell, Lenita Lane, Egon Brecher, and Fred Vogeding
 Help Wanted, with Tom Neal, Jo Ann Sayers, Clem Bevans, Edward Pawley, and Truman Bradley
 Think First
 Drunk Driving, with Richard Purcell, Jo Ann Sayers, and Richard Lane (Oscar nominee)
 Pound Foolish, with Neil Hamilton, Lynne Carver, Gertrude Michael, and Victor Varconi
 Know Your Money, with Noel Madison, Dennis Moore, Charles D. Brown, William Edmunds, John Wray, and Adrian Morris
 Jack Pot, with Tom Neal, Ann Morriss, Edwin Maxwell, and Jean Rouverol
 Women in Hiding, with Marsha Hunt, Jane Drummond, Mary Bovard, C. Henry Gordon, and Granville Bates
 Buyer Beware
 Soak the Old, with Ralph Morgan and George Cleveland
 You, the People, with C. Henry Gordon, Byron Shores, Paul Everton, and Matt McHugh
 Respect the Law, with Moroni Olsen, Richard Lane, Frank Orth, and William Forrest
 Forbidden Passage, with Addison Richards, Wolfgang Zilzer, Hugh Beaumont, and George Lessey (Oscar nominee)
 Coffins on Wheels, with Darryl Hickman, Tom Baker, Allen Lane, and Cy Kendall
 Sucker List, with Lynne Carver, Noel Madison, John Archer, and George Cleveland
 Don't Talk, with Donald Douglas, Gloria Holden, Barry Nelson, and Harry Worth (Oscar nominee)
 For the Common Defense!, with John Litel, Douglas Fowley, Horace McNally, and Van Johnson
 Keep 'em Sailing
 Plan for Destruction
 Patrolling the Ether
 Easy Life with Steven Geray, Bernard Thomas, and William "Bill Phillips
 Dark Shadows with Henry O'Neill, Morris Ankrum, Arthur Space and Paul Guilfoyle
 Fall Guy
 The Last Installment with Walter Sande, Cameron Mitchell, William "Bill" Phillips, Bob Lewis and Addison Richards
 Phantoms, Inc. with Arthur Shields, Harry Hayden and Frank Reicher
 A Gun in His Hand with Tom Trout, Richard Gaines and Anthony Caruso (Oscar nominee)
 Purity Squad with Byron Foulger, Dick Elliott, Morris Ankrum, and Frank Fenton
 The Luckiest Guy in the World with Barry Nelson, Eloise Hardt, George Travell, Milton Kibbee and Harry Cheshire (Oscar nominee)

Home video
The Warner Archive Collection has released the entire series of 50 shorts on DVD-R as Crime Does Not Pay: The Complete Shorts Collection. Some episodes can also be found as extras on DVDs and Blu-rays of classic MGM films of the period:

 The Public Pays is on Wife vs. Secretary (1936)
 Drunk Driving is on The Hunchback of Notre Dame (1939)
 Jack Pot is on I Love You Again (1940)
 Don't Talk is on Random Harvest (1941)
 For the Common Defense! is on Mrs Miniver (1942)
 Purity Squad is on Without Love (1945)
 The Luckiest Guy in the World is on Ziegfeld Follies (1945)
 Women in Hiding, You, the People, Forbidden Passage, A Gun in His Hand and The Luckiest Guy in the World are on the documentary Film Noir: Bringing Darkness to Light (2006). This was originally a bonus DVD in the "Film Noir Classic Collection: Vol. 3" box set.

References

External links
 Crime Does Not Pay film series on IMDb
 Crime Does Not Pay radio show at Zoot Radio
 Crime Does Not Pay radio show at the Internet archive
 Crime Does Not Pay (1949-1951) at Vintage Radio Logs

1940s American radio programs
1950s American radio programs
American radio dramas
Mutual Broadcasting System programs
Anthology radio series